"Going Down For the Third Time" is a song written and composed by Holland–Dozier–Holland, and recorded by Motown singing group The Supremes in 1967. The song was issued as the b-side to the popular "Reflections".

Background
The song features a fierce-sounding Diana Ross telling herself that she's "going down for the third time" in a relationship that has her "drowning in tears". Throughout the song, the narrator aches over the hardship of the relationship. Ross' band mates Florence Ballard and Mary Wilson egged her on in the chorus.

Song information
The song is prominent for being one of the last songs to feature Ballard as a member of the Supremes. A few months after this was recorded, Ballard was replaced by Cindy Birdsong.

Credits
Lead vocals by Diana Ross
Backing vocals by Florence Ballard and Mary Wilson
Additional backing vocals by The Andantes (album version only)
Instrumentation by The Funk Brothers

Cover versions
Phoebe Snow covered this song on her album “Second Childhood,” released in January, 1976.

References 

1967 songs
The Supremes songs
Songs written by Holland–Dozier–Holland
Motown singles
Song recordings produced by Brian Holland
Song recordings produced by Lamont Dozier